Langhorne Anthony "Tony" Motley (born June 5, 1938) is a former United States Ambassador to Brazil (1981–83)   and Assistant Secretary of State for Western Hemisphere Affairs (1983–85). He is a member of  the American Academy of Diplomacy and Council on Foreign Relations.  Ambassador Motley has a wife and two children.  He received his Bachelor of Arts from The Citadel in 1960.

Early life
Motley was born in Rio de Janeiro, Brazil. Time Magazine described Langhorne A. Motley as "The son of an American oil executive and a British-Brazilian mother, he was born and grew up amid sun-splashed privilege in Rio de Janeiro. After graduating from The Citadel in Charleston, S.C., Motley joined the Air Force and was posted from 1965 to 1967 in Panama—his only Central American experience—and later in Alaska. There he switched careers and founded what has since become the largest real estate firm in the state."

Professional experience

Military service: USAF (1960–70)
US Assistant Secretary of State for Western Hemisphere Affairs (1983–85)
US Ambassador to Brazil (1981–83)
Valeria, Inc. President (1980–81)
Citizens for the Management of Alaska Lands, Inc. EVP (1977–80)
Alaska State Official Commissioner of Commerce and Economic Development (1975–77)
RODMAR, Inc. VP (-1974)
Crescent Realty, Inc. President (c. 1972)
Area Realtors, Inc. (Anchorage) VP (1970-)
American Academy of Diplomacy
Bayou Leader PAC
Bush Cheney '04
Council on Foreign Relations
George W. Bush for President
Board of Telos Corporation (2004–2006)
John McCain 2008
Junior Achievement Board of Directors

Quotes
 According to a Foreign Policy Article "The Art of Leaking" published January 20, 2010, "An assistant secretary of state, Langhorne A. Motley, once defined a leak as a "premature unauthorized partial disclosure."  
 According to a news item on the St. John's University Website "Ambassador Motley then discussed his experiences working with Latin America and some general principals of U.S. relations with Latin America in general, as well as specific countries.  He also emphasized the importance and relevance of our country's foreign policy towards Latin American nations. "Up through World War II, you could separate foreign policy from domestic policy," said Ambassador Motley. "This is no longer true. Today many issues at the center of Latin American policy are also domestic issues."

References

 

1938 births
Ambassadors of the United States to Brazil
American real estate businesspeople
Businesspeople from Anchorage, Alaska
Living people
People from Rio de Janeiro (city)
State cabinet secretaries of Alaska
The Citadel, The Military College of South Carolina alumni
United States Assistant Secretaries of State
Alaska Republicans